The Lanfang Republic (Pha̍k-fa-sṳ: Làn-fông Khiung-fò-koet), also known as Lanfang Company, was a kongsi federation in Western Borneo. It was established by a Hakka Chinese named  in 1777 until it was ended by Dutch occupation in 1884.

Arrival of the Chinese 

The sultans of Western Borneo, including Sambas, Sukadana, and Landak all imported Chinese laborers in the 18th century to work in gold or tin mines. A number of mining companies enjoyed some political autonomy, but Lanfang is the best known thanks to a history written by Yap Siong-yoen, the son-in-law of the last kapitan of the Lanfang Company, which was translated into Dutch in 1885, and J.J.M. de Groot, a Dutch Sinologist who recorded Lanfang's history with the help of its last President, Liu Asheng. None of the other Chinese mining organization in western Kalimantan left written accounts; the records of the others were documented by Dutch sinologists.

Rule of Low Lan Pak 
The founding father of the Lanfang Kongsi was Low Lan Pak, who hailed from Meizhou in Guangdong Province. Chinese settlers have long lived on Borneo, with most engaging in trading and mining. They formed their own companies, among which was the Southern Company headed by Low.

As Dutch imperialism encroached upon modern-day Indonesia, Low established the Lanfang Company in 1777 (with its capital in Mandor) to protect the Chinese settlers from Dutch oppression. The settlers subsequently elected Low as their inaugural leader. Low implemented many democratic principles, including the idea that all matters of state must involve the consultation of the republic's citizenry. The Republic did not have a standing military, but had a defense ministry that administered a national militia based on conscription. During peacetime, the populace mostly engaged in farming, production, trading, and mining. Lanfang's administrative divisions included three tiers (province, prefecture, and county) with the people electing leaders for all levels. Lanfang was allied with Sultan Abdurrahman of the Pontianak Sultanate.

Low served as head of state until his death in 1795. Afterwards, Lanfang members elected Jiang Wubo as their next president. Lanfang citizens elected a total of twelve leaders, who helped improve agricultural techniques, expand mine production, develop cultural education, and organize military training.

Dutch conquest 
In the mid-to-late 19th century, the Chinese Qing Empire weakened substantially. Thus, the Lanfang Company's vigorous development suffered from the eventual expansion of the Dutch. The Mandor community waged a tenacious resistance, but ultimately failed due to poor weaponry. Lin Ah Sin was the last leader of Lanfang. Many of Lanfang's citizens and their descendants made their way to Sumatra or Singapore. The three campaigns waged by the Dutch East Indies Army against the Lanfang Company:
 Expedition to the West Coast of Borneo (1822–24)
 Expedition against the Chinese in Montrado (1850–54)
 Chinese uprising in Mandor, Borneo (1884–85)
This last one resulted in the subjugation of the Chinese and the loss of autonomy.

Wary of Qing intervention, the Dutch did not openly annex the lands controlled by the Lanfang Company, and created another puppet regime. It was not until 1912, when the Qing Dynasty collapsed, that the Dutch proclaimed their occupation.

See also 

 Kengwei Republic

References

Citations

Sources 
 
 
 
 
 
 
 
 
 
 
 
 
 
 
 
 
 
 
 
 
 
 
 

 
 
 
 
 
 
 
 
 
 .

External links 
 Info at Asiawind.com

Kongsi federations
Chinese diaspora in Southeast Asia
Former countries in Southeast Asia
Former countries in Borneo
Former republics
Hakka
Qing dynasty
Precolonial states of Indonesia
States and territories disestablished in 1884
States and territories established in 1777
18th-century establishments in Indonesia
Chinese-speaking countries and territories